Orp-Jauche is a municipality of Wallonia located in the Belgian province of Walloon Brabant. On January 1, 2008, Orp-Jauche had a total population of 8,400. The total area is 50.50 km² which gives a population density of 159 inhabitants per km².

The municipality consists of the following districts: Énines, Folx-les-Caves, Jauche, Jandrain-Jandrenouille, Marilles, Noduwez, and Orp-le-Grand.

See also 
 John II of Cottereau, Baron of Jauche

References

External links
 

 
Municipalities of Walloon Brabant